Patriots: A Nation Under Fire is a computer game created by American studio 4D Rulers and published by SilverLine Software. The game was released for Microsoft Windows. It posits the player in the position of a United States Army National Guard soldier whose purpose is to defend the United States of America from a terrorist invasion. Terrorists have invaded US soil in an attempt to seize nuclear weapons and research facilities. On March 4, 2009, THQ Nordic GmbH released the game through GamersGate.

Plot 
The game begins with a short background. Major cities of the United States have been attacked by nuclear weapons. Armies of terrorists flock the shores and have taken over most of the country. The player assumes the role of a United States Army National Guard soldier. He is called into the local military base, only to find it overrun by terrorists. From there, the mission is to defeat the terrorist invasion.

Reception 
Patriots: A Nation Under Fire was released to overwhelmingly negative reviews. It has been criticized for its poor quality, especially when it comes to graphical fidelity and gameplay. The game has been criticized for its extreme difficulty, even while playing on the easiest difficulty setting. Due to bugs and glitches, it is impossible to complete mission three.

Controversy 
Patriots: A Nation Under Fire received a rating from Pan European Game Information 18 with content descriptors: violence, bad language and discrimination. In regards to the game content, it is apparent that the terrorist organisation in the game are discriminating against all “infidels” (Americans). The game is exempt from classification under United Kingdom law.

Availability 
Patriots: A Nation Under Fire is available to digital purchase on GamersGate.

References

External links
 Official website
 4D Rulers
 Gamespot Review
 Difficulty Patch

2007 video games
First-person shooters
Video games developed in the United States
Video games set in the United States
Windows games
Windows-only games